Denis Kearney (1847–1907) was a California labor leader from Ireland who was active in the late 19th century and was known for his anti-Chinese activism. Called "a demagogue of extraordinary power," he frequently gave long and caustic speeches that focused on four general topics: contempt for the press, for capitalists, for politicians, and for Chinese immigrants. A leader of the Workingmen's Party of California, he is known for ending all of his speeches with the sentence "And whatever happens, the Chinese must go" (a conscious inspiration from Roman senator Cato the Elder's fame for ending all speeches with ceterum autem censeo Carthaginem esse delendam – "Furthermore, I consider that Carthage must be destroyed".)

Kearney was part of a short-lived movement to increase the power of the working class, but after a few years his increasingly vitriolic language and his repeated arrests for inciting violence alienated many of those whom he was trying to influence. When the economy grew stronger in the early 1880s, Kearney faded from public notice. He started an employment agency where he worked until his health began to fail around 1900. He died in Alameda, California, in 1907.

Biography

Early years
Kearney was born in Oakmount, County Cork, Ireland. In Census and voter registration records his birth year is listed as either 1846, 1847 or 1848. The second of seven sons, he left home after his father died when he was just 11 years old. He became a cabin boy on the clipper ship Shooting Star, and by his own account he "circumnavigated the globe." In 1868 he arrived in the United States and married an Irish woman named Mary Ann Leary. Census records list a daughter, Maggie, was born in 1871. Two years later he and his family settled in San Francisco, where he became a U.S. citizen and started a drayage business. A son, William, was born in 1873, and another daughter, Amelia, was born in 1875. By 1877 his business was so well established that he owned five wagons and hauled goods throughout the city.

That same year, Kearney entered into the public arena when he challenged a city-backed monopoly on carting and hauling. As part of this effort he helped to start a loosely organized  association of laborers, which within a year's time grew into the Workingmen's Party of California. For several years the Workingmen's Party would provide a forum for Kearney to speak before growing crowds of unemployed people in San Francisco. At first his speeches focused on uniting the poor and the working class while attacking the greed of big business, especially the railroads. He thought of himself as a "workingman's advocate", although he remained highly critical of unions throughout his life and frequently denounced strikes.

Hubert Bancroft, author in the late 1880s of an influential history of California, considered the Workingmen's Party to be "ignorant Irish rabble, even though that rabble sometimes paraded the streets as a great political party." Kearney's Irish immigrant background made him subject to frequent accusations that he was a foreign agitator. Middle class critics, fearful of Kearney's radical rhetoric and pledges, questioned whether Irish immigrants—embodied by Kearney—should have the right to dictate social policy in San Francisco. As The Argonaut, the newspaper founded and published by the former Attorney General of California, Frank Pixley, noted:

When an organization, composed almost entirely of aliens, who are themselves here by the sufferance of a generous hospitality, band themselves together in defiance of the law to drive out a class, who, however objectionable, have the same legal rights as themselves, it is an act of insolent audacity that ought to move the indignation of every honest man.

Labor organizer and orator

In spite of growing criticism, Kearney's popularity increased. At an outdoor gathering place near San Francisco City Hall known as "The Sandlot" he regularly spoke in front of crowds that numbered as many as 2,000 people. Observers said he had a natural ability to stir up crowds, and since his speeches often lasted as long as two hours he had plenty of opportunity to incite the audience. One of his trademarks was to gradually increase the volume of his speech until it reached fever pitch, then dramatically throw off his coat and unbutton his collar. Such gestures "always provoked a storm of applause."

Kearney never attended school, but he was a prolific reader and loved to engage in debates. He attended a club in San Francisco known as the Lyceum of Self-Culture, where he sharpened his speaking skills at weekly forums. One of his contemporaries described him as "temperate in everything but speech." He was said to speak forcibly, and when he wanted to make a point he used words "like a missile." The Boston Globe said "Mr. Kearney has power, and his power is that of the kind which to be appreciated must be seen and heard. It cannot be properly described."

In some of his speeches Kearny did not hesitate to urge people to take violent actions against politicians and other leaders. He frequently urged people to take immediate retribution on politicians who broke promises. "Shoot the first man that goes back on you after you have elected him intelligently;" he said, "see that you hunt him down and shoot him." In another speech he declared "Before I starve in this country I will cut a man's throat and take whatever he has got ... The Workingmen's Party must win, even if it has to wade knee deep in blood and perish in battle."

Although Kearney was arrested several times for inciting violence, he was always released when charges were either dropped or no one would testify against him. His arrests only served to further his popularity and increase the membership in the Workingmen's Party.

Anti-Chinese immigration agitator

In one of his early speeches he urged laborers to be "thrifty and industrious like the Chinese", but within a year's time he began denouncing Chinese immigrants as the cause of white workers' economic woes. By 1878 he used the Sandlot forum to give frequent and violent speeches against Chinese immigrants and the problems he claimed they caused. He warned railroad owners that they had three months to fire all of their Chinese workers or "remember Judge Lynch."

Within a short time he was known throughout California for his racially charged speeches in which he repeated his slogan "The Chinese must go."

In 1878, Kearney traveled to Boston to carry his message against the Chinese to eastern audiences. He was warmly welcomed, and it was estimated that "thousands, indeed, packed Faneuil Hall on August 5 to hear his first speech, and thousands more had to be turned away." Within a short time, however, the crowds at his speeches began to dwindle. The Boston Journal noted "the workingmen of this state are by no means united in welcoming Kearney ... Many of them have no sympathy with his anti-Chinese policy, they dislike his openly Communistic principles, and will not endure his conceited intolerance."

While in Massachusetts he campaigned with the Massachusetts politician Benjamin Butler, the Greenback Party's candidate for President. Kearney sought the Vice Presidential nomination, although Butler never offered it to him. After criticism of him increased in editorials and articles in eastern newspapers, he returned to San Francisco.

Kearny sometimes crossed paths with Chinese-American civil rights activist Wong Chin Foo. Wong challenged Kearney to a duel on the occasion of a speech by Kearney in New York in 1883, giving Kearney "his choice of chopsticks, Irish potatoes, or Krupp guns." Kearney responded by calling Wong an "almond-eyed leper."  Wong's darkly sarcastic commentary on Christian hypocrisy Why I am a Heathen speculated that Kearney might slip into heaven (via an eleventh-hour repentance), and proceed to "organize a heavenly crusade to have me and others immediately cast out and into the other place."

Later life
Kearney faded from the public's eye by the early 1880s, leaving as his legacy only the anti-Chinese laws that the Workingmen's Party had passed at the 1879 California Constitutional Convention. Many of these laws, which included a ban on the employment of Chinese laborers, were ruled unconstitutional by the federal Ninth Circuit Court. Corresponding with the Irish author and politician James Bryce in the late 1880s, Kearney nonetheless claimed credit for making the "Chinese Question" a national issue and affecting the legislation of the Chinese Exclusion Act in 1882.

Today there is a Kearny Street in San Francisco that runs through Chinatown; however it was not named after Denis Kearney but after the Mexican–American War Army officer Stephen W. Kearny.

Excerpts from Kearney's speeches
 "When the Chinese question is settled, we can discuss whether it would be better to hang, shoot, or cut the capitalists to pieces. In six months we will have 50,000 men ready to go out ... and if 'John' [the Chinese] don't leave here, we will drive him and his aborts [sic] into the sea ... We are ready to do it ... If the ballot fails, we are ready to use the bullet."
 "When I have thoroughly organized my party, we will march through the city and compel the thieves to give up their plunder. I will lead you to the City Hall, clean out the police force, hang the Prosecuting Attorney, burn every book that has a particle of law in it, and then enact new laws for the workingmen."
 "For reporters of the press I have great respect. The reporters of the newspapers are workingmen, like ourselves working for bread and butter. But for the villainous, serpent-like, slimy imps of hell that run the newspapers, I have the utmost contempt."
 "If the legislature oversteps decency, then hemp is the battle-cry." [referring to hemp ropes that could be used in lynchings]

In popular culture 
 Dean Jagger plays the role of Dylan Leary on Warrior, who is based on Denis Kearney.

See also
 Carl Browne
 San Francisco Riot of 1877
 Workingmen's Party of California

Footnotes

Works
 The Workingmen's Party of California: An Epitome of Its Rise and Progress. San Francisco: Bacon, 1878.
 Speeches of Denis Kearney, Labor Champion. New York: Jesse Haney & Co., 1878.

Further reading
 Henry George, "The Kearney Agitation in California," Virtual Museum of the City of San Francisco, www.sfmuseum.net/
 Michael Kazin, "The July Days in San Francisco, 1877: Prelude to Kearneyism," in David O. Stowell (ed.), The Great Strikes of 1877. Urbana, IL: University of Illinois Press, 2008; pp. 136–163.
 Alexander Saxton. The Indispensable Enemy: Labor and the Anti-Chinese Movement in California. Berkeley: University of California Press, 1971.
 Neil Larry Shumsky, The Evolution of Political Protest and the Workingmen's Party of California. Columbus: Ohio State University Press, 1992.

External links

 Political cartoon depicting Kearney, The Bancroft Library
 

1840s births
1907 deaths
American anti-capitalists
Left-wing populism in the United States
Chinese-American history
History of immigration to the United States
Anti-Chinese sentiment in the United States
Irish emigrants to the United States (before 1923)
People from County Cork
California Greenbacks
Workingmen's Party of California people
People with acquired American citizenship
American white supremacists